Artem Bobukh (born 4 December 1988) is a Ukrainian former football defender.

Career
Bobukh began playing professional football with FC Volyn Lutsk's team. He would next spend 1.5 years with its club. Last time, 19 September 2010, he signed a contract with Metalist Kharkiv in the Ukrainian Premier League.

References

External links

1988 births
Living people
Ukrainian footballers
Association football defenders
Ukrainian expatriate footballers
Expatriate footballers in Belarus
Ukrainian expatriate sportspeople in Belarus
Ukrainian Premier League players
FC Metalist Kharkiv players
FC Volyn Lutsk players
FC Feniks-Illichovets Kalinine players
FC Obolon-Brovar Kyiv players
FC Kryvbas Kryvyi Rih players
FC Belshina Bobruisk players
FC Slutsk players
Sportspeople from Sumy